Tadeusz Śliwiak (1928–1994) was a Polish poet.

1928 births
1994 deaths
Burials at Rakowicki Cemetery
Writers from Lviv
20th-century Polish poets
Recipient of the Meritorious Activist of Culture badge